This article lists census-designated places (CDPs) in the U.S. state of Louisiana. As of the 2010 census, there were a total of 169 census-designated places in Louisiana.

Census-designated places

References

See also
List of cities, towns, and villages in Louisiana
List of unincorporated communities in Louisiana
Louisiana census statistical areas

 
Census-designated places
Louisiana